Fernando Damián Tissone Rodrigues (born 24 July 1986) is an Argentine professional footballer who plays as a central midfielder for Serie D club Budoni.

Career

Early career
Tissone was born in Quilmes, Buenos Aires Province. He started his football career in Independiente's youth system before moving to neighbours Lanús.

Udinese
 and making 26 Serie A appearances for the club, mainly as a substitute.

Atalanta
On 10 August 2006, Tissone was signed by Atalanta in a co-ownership deal for €1.5 million in a five-year deal. However, Udinese also acquired 50% of the registration rights of both Michele Rinaldi for €800,000 and Christian Tiboni for €1.1 million, Tissone played 33 games for the Bergamo-based club in 2006–07 Serie A season. In June 2007 the co-ownerships were renewed.

Tissone made 35 appearances in 2007–08 Serie A, missing only three match, including a suspension for a fourth yellow card received.

On 26 June 2008, Tissone returned to Udinese for €4.165 million, with Rinaldi and Tiboni both returning to Atalanta for undisclosed fees (which Atalanta immediately write-down their value).

Udinese return

Sampdoria
On 22 July 2009, Tissone joined Sampdoria in a co-ownership from Udinese, for €2.5 million cash and 50% of the registration rights of Jonathan Rossini; Tissone signed four-year contract. He remained at the club for two seasons, appearing in 52 league matches and scoring once, against Brescia on 1 May 2011. The co-ownerships were renewed in June 2010 and June 2011.

On 31 August 2011, Tissone was loaned to La Liga side Mallorca. He made his debut in the competition on 11 September, coming on as a late substitute in a 0–1 loss at Real Betis.

Tissone featured regularly with the Balearic outfit during the 2011–12 campaign, and returned to Samp in June 2012. In June 2012, Sampdoria acquired Tissone outright from Udinese for an additional €100,000. Tissone made 12 appearances in 2012–13 Serie A for Sampdoria

On 29 January 2013, Tissone returned to Mallorca, on loan until June, for €100,000.

Málaga
After Mallorca's relegation to the Segunda División, Tissone moved to La Liga side Málaga in a three-year deal on 6 July 2013 on a free transfer.

CD Nacional
On 28 September 2018, Tissone signed for Nacional.

Later years
In January 2021, after over a year of inactivity, Tissone signed a six-month contract for Italian Serie D club Taranto, with whom he won promotion to Serie C. He successively joined Serie C club Paganese for the 2021–22 season. In November 2022, Tissone joined Budoni.

Personal life
Tissone holds an Italian passport, and is also eligible for Cape Verde due to his grandfather.

Tissone's brother, Christian, is also a footballer, but spent the vast majority of his career representing Italian lower division sides, and also switched his nationality to Cape Verde.

Honours
Aves
Taça de Portugal: 2017–18

References

External links

1986 births
Living people
People from Quilmes
Argentine people of Italian descent
Sportspeople of Italian descent
Argentine expatriate sportspeople in Portugal
Afro-Argentine sportspeople
Sportspeople of Cape Verdean descent
Argentine footballers
Association football midfielders
Club Atlético Independiente footballers
Club Atlético Lanús footballers
Serie A players
Udinese Calcio players
Atalanta B.C. players
U.C. Sampdoria players
La Liga players
RCD Mallorca players
Málaga CF players
Ukrainian Premier League players
FC Karpaty Lviv players
Primeira Liga players
C.D. Aves players
C.D. Nacional players
Argentine expatriate footballers
Argentine expatriate sportspeople in Italy
Argentine expatriate sportspeople in Spain
Expatriate footballers in Italy
Expatriate footballers in Spain
Expatriate footballers in Ukraine
Expatriate footballers in Portugal
Argentine expatriate sportspeople in Ukraine
Sportspeople from Buenos Aires Province